Chalybion californicum, the common blue mud dauber of North America, is a metallic blue species of mud dauber wasp first described by Henri Louis Frédéric de Saussure in 1867. It is not normally aggressive towards humans. It is similar in shape and colour to the steel-blue cricket hunter (Chlorion aerarium). Like other types of wasps, males do not have an ovipositor, and therefore cannot sting. It is ranged from northern Mexico to southern Canada, including most of the United States. It has also been introduced to regions including Hawaii, Bermuda, Croatia and other European countries.

Behavior 
Females can build their own nests, but often refurbish nests abandoned by other wasps and bees, particularly those of [[black and yellow mud dauber|Sceliphron caementarium]], removing any spiders captured by S. caementarium and the larva, replacing it with an egg of its own and freshly caught spiders. They go through multiple generations in a year.

 Interaction with other species 
This species is most famous for its predation of black widow spiders. Adults feed on the nectar of flowers, which powers their flight. They pollinate some common wildflowers, including Berberis vulgaris, Daucus carota, and Zizia aurea. Larvae are fed spiders, often Latrodectus mactans''. They prefer to hunt prey on the ground or under rocks.

References 

Sphecidae
Hymenoptera of North America
Insects described in 1867
Biological pest control wasps